Vyacheslav Nikolayevich Petrukhin (born December 29, 1953) is a retired Russian professional football player. Currently, he works as a director for FC Torpedo-ZIL Moscow.

External links
 Career summary at KLISF

1953 births
Living people
Soviet footballers
FC Torpedo Moscow players
FC Zimbru Chișinău players
FC Dnipro players
FC Lokomotiv Moscow players
FC Tyumen players
Association football midfielders